Julie Dawn (originally Juliana Rosalba Maria Theresa Mostosi; 2 August 1920 – 18 May 2000) was an English singer, singing with leading dance bands in the 1940s and 1950s, and making recordings and radio broadcasts. In later years she presented radio programmes.

Life
She was born in England in 1920. Her parents were Italian immigrants; her father was the head waiter at the Savoy Hotel in London. From age 13 to 15 she took a piano and music course at the Guildhall School of Music. In 1939, after singing at a party given by the Quaglino brothers, she was engaged by them to sing at their restaurant. She changed her name on the advice of the showbusiness journalist Collie Knox, and in late 1939 as Julie Dawn she made her first radio broadcast.

After Italy entered the Second World War, her parents were interned until 1945. Julie Dawn joined Harry Roy's band in 1940 and toured with them; he left them in 1941 and joined the Eric Winstone Quartet. She made recordings with him after he formed a band, and also with Harry Leader and Billy Thorburn.

In 1944 she worked with Carroll Gibbons and the Savoy Orpheans. For three weeks she toured France, Belgium and Holland with Geraldo  to entertain troops, and towards the end of the war she performed in Germany with Eric Winstone.

After the war she sang with Art Thompson at the Embassy Club, and then with the Lew Stone band. For two years she broadcast three times a week with the BBC Showband led by Cyril Stapleton.

She later became a programme presenter on BBC Radio 2, where a twice-weekly programme ran for five years. From 1977 on Radio 2 she presented "Julie Dawn's Penfriend Programme", which was very successful, running for 10 years. It was broadcast three times a week: people who lived alone were put in touch with others in similar circumstances.

Julie Dawn was married twice; her second husband David died in 1992.

References

External links
 

1920 births
2000 deaths
English broadcasters
English people of Italian descent
20th-century English women singers
20th-century English singers